Contextual theatre is a form of theatre and the art of creating a context in which an actor, player or audience is encouraged to suspend their disbelief and feel as if they freely exist within the context. The most common forms of contextual theatre are theme parks, video games and haunted houses.

References

Theatrical genres